Andrew Marsh (born 1 November 1952) was an English cricketer. He was a right-handed batsman and slow left-arm bowler who played for Dorset. He was born in Bridport, Dorset.

Marsh made a single List A appearance for the team, during the 1973 Gillette Cup, against Staffordshire. From the lower order, he scored a single run, and took bowling figures of 0–33.

Following a single appearance for the team in the 1973 Minor Counties championship, he did not appear again in the competition until 1986.

External links
Andrew Marsh at Cricket Archive 

1952 births
Living people
English cricketers
Dorset cricketers
People from Bridport
Cricketers from Dorset